Fray Juan de Gaona (1507–1560) was a Franciscan friar. Born in 1507 in Burgos Spain, he studied at the University of Paris before journeying to New Spain in 1538.

Gaona died on 27 September 1560. Around 1542 he composed a Nahuatl-language text, Colloquies de la Paz, y tranquilidad Christiana ("Dialogues of peace and Christian tranquillity"), which was published after his death in 1582.

Notes

References
 
 
  
 

–

External links
 
 Colloquios de la paz, y tranquilidad Christiana, en lengua Mexicana at Biblioteca Virtual Miguel de Cervantes

1507 births
1560 deaths
Spanish Franciscans
University of Paris alumni
Nahuatl-language writers
Spanish Mesoamericanists
16th-century Mesoamericanists
Spanish expatriates in France
People of New Spain